This article is a list of people proposed by each diocese of the Catholic Church for beatification and canonization, whose causes have been officially opened during the papacy of Pope Francis and are newly given the title as Servants of God. The names listed below are from the Vatican and are listed in month beginning the year 2013, with their birth and death year, position in clerical or religious life, and the place where the saint-to-be lived or died.

In the Latin Church of the Catholic Church, Servant of God is the style used for a person whose life is being investigated by the Church for possible sainthood.

2022

2021

2020

2019

2018

October 2018
 Paola Adamo (1963-1978), Child of the Archdiocese of Taranto (Italy)
 Ibrahim Addai Scher (d. 1918) and 27 Companion Martyrs of the Assyrian-Chaldean-Syriac Genocide (d. 1915–18), Archeparchs, Eparchs, Priests, Catechumens, and Laypersons of the Archeparchy of Urmia; Priests of the Congregation of the Mission (Vincentians); Martyrs (Iraq-Iran)
 Pierangelo Capuzzimati (1990-2008), Young Layperson of the Archdiocese of Taranto (Italy)
 Amanda Gilseth Ruiz Suarez [Amandita] (1999-2005), Child of the Archdiocese of San Cristobal de Venezuela (Venezuela)
 Marian Zelazek (1918-2006), Professed Priest of the Society of the Divine Word (Poland-India)

September 2018
 Domenica Crocifissa Lolli [Nina] (1901-2006), Layperson of the Archdiocese of Brindisi-Ostuni (Italy)
 Giovanni Antonio Rabbi (1693-1785), Priest of the Diocese of Bergamo (Italy)

July 2018
 Pedro Arrupe Gondra (1909-1991), Professed Priest of the Jesuits (Spain-Italy)
 Kazimierz Stanisław Badeni (Joachim) (1912-2010), Professed Priest of the Dominicans (Belgium-Poland)
 Agostino Bartolini (1918-2012), Professed Priest of the Carmelites of the Ancient Observance (Italy)
 Elia Carbonaro (1893-1973), Professed Priest of the Carmelites of the Ancient Observance (Italy)
 Amata Cerretelli (1907-1963), Layperson of the Archdiocese of Florence; Member of the Secular Carmelites (Italy)
 Maddalena Fezza (1811-1877), Layperson of the Diocese of Nocera Inferiore-Sarno (Italy)
 Alfonso María López Sendín (1906-2002), Professed Priest of the Carmelites of the Ancient Observance (Spain)
 Vivian Uchechi Ogu (1995-2009), Child of the Diocese Mbaise ; Martyr (Nigeria)
 Domingos Evangelista Pinheiro (1843-1924), Priest of the Archdiocese of Belo Horizonte; Founder of the Sisters Helpers of Our Lady of Pieta (Brazil)
 Walenty Tobiński (Gwala) (1908-1999), Professed Priest of the Dominicans (Poland)
 Philomena Vallayil (Mary Francesca de Chantal) (1880-1972), Founder of the Sisters of Adoration of the Blessed Sacrament (India)

June 2018
 Luigi Pedrollo (1888-1986), Professed Priest of the Poor Servants of Divine Providence (Calabrians) (Italy)

May 2018 

 Thea Bowman (1937-1990, Black Catholic religious sister with the Franciscan Sisters of Perpetual Adoration, educator, and activist (United States)

April 2018
 Salvador García Pintos (1891-1956), Married Layperson of the Archdiocese of Montevideo (Uruguay)
 Annunziata Addolorata Lafranco (Teresa) (1920-1989), Professed Religious of the Daughters of Saint Mary of Leuca (Italy)
 Annakkutty Payyappilly (Mary Celine) (1906-1993), Professed Religious of the Congregation of the Mother of Carmel (India)

March 2018
 Enrichetta Beltrame Quattrocchi (1914-2012), Layperson of the Vicariate of Rome (Italy)
 Chiara Corbella Petrillo (1984-2012), Young Married Layperson of the Vicariate of Rome (Italy)
 João dal Monte (Inácio of Ribeirão Preto) (1897-1963), Professed Priest of the Franciscan Capuchins; Bishop of Guaxupé (Brazil)
 Pietrino di Natale (1966-1984), Young Layperson of the Diocese of Teramo-Atri (Italy)
 Diego Gutierréz Pedraza (1894-1990), Professed Priest of the Augustinians; Bishop of Cafayate (Spain)
 Stefano Lamera (1912-1997), Professed Priest of the Society of Saint Paul (Paulines) (Italy)
 Salustiano Míguelez Romero (1919-1999), Professed Priest of the Augustinians (Spain)
 Cecilia Moshe Hanna (1931-2002), Professed Religious of the Daughters of the Sacred Heart of Jesus (Chaldeans); Martyr (Iraq)
 Cesare Sarafini (Michelangelo of Cingoli) (1908-2013), Professed Priest of the Franciscan Capuchins (Italy-Brazil)
 Adrienne von Speyr (1902-1967), Married Layperson of the Diocese of Basel; Cofounder of the Secular Institute of the Community of Saint John (Switzerland)
 Avhustyn-Klement Tsebrovs'kyi (1888-1944), Married Priest of the Archeparchy of Lviv of the Ukrainians (Ukraine)
 Hans Urs von Balthasar (1905-1988), Priest of the Diocese of Chur; Cardinal-elect; Cofounder of the Secular Institute of the Community of Saint John (Switzerland)

February 2018
 Ragheed Aziz Ganni (1972-2007), Basman Yousef Daud Al-Yousef (1982-2007), Wahid Hanna Isho (1966-2007), and Gassan Isam Bidawed (1983-2007), Priest and Subdeacons of the Archeparchy of Mosul of the Chaldeans; Martyrs (Iraq)
 Roman Kotlarz (1928-1976), Priest of the Diocese of Radom; Martyr (Poland)

January 2018
 Antoni Baraniak (1904-1977), Professed Priest of the Salesians of Don Bosco; Archbishop of Poznan (Poland)
 Adelrich Benziger (Aloysius of Saint Mary) (1864-1942), Professed Priest of the Discalced Carmelites; Bishop of Quilon (Switzerland-India)
 Julianus Buyck (Adeodatus of Saint Peter) (1896-1968), Professed Priest of the Discalced Carmelites (Belgium-India)
 Florencia Cuesta Valluerca (Trinidad of the Sacred Heart of Jesus) (1904-1967), Professed Religious of the Carmelite Nuns of the Ancient Observance (Spain-Philippines)
 Léo Tarcísio Gonçalves Pereira (1961-2007), Professed Priest of the Congregation of the Sacred Heart of Jesus (Dehonians); Founder of the "Bethânia" Community (Brazil)
 Giacobo Gratij [Jacobo de Gracia] (1517-1619), Priest of the Archdiocese of Madrid (Italy-Spain)
 Hernando de Talavera (ca. 1430–1507), Professed Priest of the Hieronymites; Archbishop of Granada (Spain)

2017

December 2017
 Antonia Luzmila Rivas López (María Augustina) (1920-1990), Professed Religious of the Religious of the Good Shepherd; Martyr (Peru)
 Mercedes Reyes Sánchez (Mercedes of Saint Therese) (1930-2012), Professed Religious of the Discalced Carmelite Nuns (Colombia)

October 2017
 Ana María Moreno Castillo [Niña Anita] (1887-1977), Layperson of the Diocese of Chitré (Panama)
 Isabelle Abdullah El-Khoury (1878-1953), Founder and Renovator of the Antonine Sisters (Beirut, Lebanon)

September 2017
 Edda Roda (Adalberta of the Holy Trinity) (1940-1996), Professed Religious of the Capuchin Sisters of Mother Rubatto (Italy)
 Ivan Veliamyn Rutskyi (1571-1637), Archeparch of Kiev; Restorer of the Basilians of Saint Josaphat (Belarus-Ukraine)

August 2017
 Adalberto Almeida Merino (1916-2008), Archbishop of Chihuahua (Mexico)
 Richard Michael Fernando (Richie) (1970-1996), Professed Cleric of the Jesuits; Martyr (Philippines-Cambodia)

July 2017
 Élise Bisschop (1925-1964), Layperson of the Diocese of Sens-Auxerre (France)
 Moisés Cisneros Rodríguez (1945-1991), Professed Religious of the Marist Brothers of the Schools; Martyr (Spain-Guatemala)
 Enrique Esteve Francisco (Enrique Maria) (1905-1990), Professed Priest of the Carmelites of Ancient Observance (Spain)
 Marie-Melanie [Marie-Noëlle] Rouget (1883-1967), Layperson of the Diocese of Sens-Auxerre (France)

June 2017
 Bruno Cornacchiola (1913-2001), Married Layperson of the Vicariate of Rome; Founder of the Association of the Ardent Hosts of Christ Immortal King (Italy)
 Anna Figus (Anna of Jesus) (1900-1995), Founder of the Sisters of Redemption (Italy)
 Wilhelm Gaczel and 3 Companions (d. 1941–42), Professed Priests and Religious of the Augustinians; Martyrs (Poland-Germany)
 Fernando González Saborío (1927-1957), Priest of the Diocese of Tilaran-Liberia (Costa Rica)
 Michael Power (1804-1847), Bishop of Toronto (Canada)
 Ramón Sáinz Orozco (1882-1937), Married Layperson of the Diocese of San Juan de los Lagos; Martyr (Mexico)

May 2017
 María Isabel [Marisa] Acuña Arias (1941-1954), Child of the Archdiocese of San Jose de Costa Rica (Costa Rica)
 Giovanni Antonio Baldeschi (1780-1840), Priest of the Vicariate of Rome; Cofounder of the Sisters of Perpetual Adoration (Italy)
 Alma Sacco Ferrara (1914-2000), Married Layperson of the Vicariate of Rome (Italy)
 Lucio Leon Cardenas (1913-2010), Married Layperson of the Archdiocese of San Cristobal de Venezuela (Venezuela)
 Juan Morrera Coll (Casiano María of Madrid) (1892-1965), Professed Priest of the Franciscan Capuchins (Spain-Costa Rica)
 Bernhard Poether (1906-1942), Priest of the Diocese of Munster; Martyr (Germany)
 Victor Manuel Sanabria Martínez (1898-1952), Archbishop of San Jose de Costa Rica (Costa Rica)

April 2017
 Élisabeth Philippine Marie Hélène de France (1764–1794), Layperson of the Archdiocese of Paris; Martyr (France)
 Annammal Selvanayagam Pillai (1836–1883), Founder of the Sisters of Saint Anne of Tiruchirappalli (India)
 Sepé Tiaraju (ca. 1723–1756), Layperson of the Diocese of Bagé (Brazil)
 Palmira (Maria Anselma) Viola (1892-1983), Founder of the Missionary Catechist Sisters of Jesus the Redeemer (Italy)

March 2017
 Wilhelm Frede (1875–1942), Married Layperson of the Diocese of Munster; Martyr (Germany)
 Maria Lilia Mastacchini (1892–1926), Founder of the Institute of Pious Workers (Italy)
 Beniamino Miori (1883–1946), Professed Priest of the Stigmatines (Italy)
 José María Pujadas Ferrer (1915–1984), Priest of the Archdiocese of Barcelona; Founder of the Encounters of Youth Promotion (Spain)
 Victor Rodriguez Martinez (1925–2012), Married Layperson of the Archdiocese of Valladolid; Member of the Lay Carmelites (Spain)
 Pedro Manuel Salado de Alba (1968–2012), Layperson of the Diocese of Esmeraldas; Member of the Ecclesial Family "Hogar de Nazaret" (Spain-Ecuador)
 Colette Lamontagne Samson (1923–1991), Married Layperson of the Archdiocese of Quebec (Canada)

2016

December 2016
 Alicja Poppe (Maria Yelisaveta) (1884–1970), Cofounder of the Sisters of Charity of Saint Vincent de Paul (Greek Catholic) (Belgium-Ukraine)
 Peter John Roche (Alfred of Moodahadu) (1924–1996), Professed Priest of the Franciscan Capuchins (India)
 Laura Vincenzi (1963–1987), Young Layperson of the Archdiocese of Ferraro-Comacchio (Italy)
 Rhoda Greer Wise (1888-1948), Married Layperson of the Diocese of Youngstown (United States)
 Julia Greeley (?-1918), Black Catholic philanthropist and evangelist in Denver, Colorado (United States)

November 2016
 Mario Bortoletto (1938–2009), Priest of the Diocese of Treviso; Fidei Donum Missionary in the Diocese of Ebolowa; Associate of the Pontifical Institute for Foreign Missions (Italy-Cameroon)
 Léontine Dolivet (1888–1974), Layperson of the Archdiocese of Lyon (France)
 Antonio Loi (1936–1965), Priest of the Archdiocese of Cagliari (Italy)
 Inôcencio López Santamaria (1874–1958), Professed Priest of the Mercedarians; Bishop of Sao Raimundo Nonato (Spain-Brazil)
 Domenico Antonio Mangano (1916–2001), Married Layperson of the Diocese of Albano; member of the Volunteers of God – Focolare Movement (Italy)

October 2016
 Luisa Mabalane Mafo (1943–1992) and 22 Lay Companions from the Catechetical Center of Guiua (d. 1992), Married Catechists, Catechumens, Young Laypersons and Children of the Diocese of Imhanbane; Martyrs (Mozambique)
 Carmen Nebot Soldán de Noguera (1933–2007), Married Layperson of the Diocese of Huelva (Spain)
 Joaquín Reina Castrillón (1902–1975), Professed Priest of the Jesuits; Founder of the Servants of the Poor, Daughters of the Sacred Heart of Jesus (Spain)

September 2016
 Celso Benigno Luigi Costantini (1876–1958), Titular Archbishop of Theodosiopolis in Arcadia; Founder of the Congregation of the Disciples of the Lord; Cardinal (Italy)
 Jacques Hamel (1930–2016), Priest of the Archdiocese of Rouen; Martyr (France)
 Rudolf Lunkenbein (1939–1976), Professed Priest of the Salesians of Don Bosco (Germany-Brazil)
 Simão Cristino Koge Kudugodu [Simão Bororó] (1937–1976), Layperson of the Diocese of Barra do Garcas; Martyrs (Brazil)
 Laura Pérez Sénchez (1928-1966), Professed Member of the Secular Institute of the Apostolic Missionaries of Charity (Spain)
 Sergio Sorgon (Sergio of Saint Joseph) (1938–1985), Professed Priest of the Discalced Carmelites (Italy-Madagascar)

August 2016
 Vitória Nabo Correia Bixarxe (Vitória of the Incarnation) (1661–1715), Professed Religious of the Poor Clare Nuns (Brazil)
 Nicholas Black Elk (1863–1950), Married Layperson of the Diocese of Rapid City; Catechist (United States)
 Kazimierz Antoni Hołoga (1913–1958), Married Layperson of the Archdiocese of Poznań (Poland)
 Mary Bernadette Prasad Kispotta (1878–1961), Founder of the Daughters of Saint Anne of Ranchi (India)
 Louis-Marie Leveil (1889–1973), Professed Priest of the Jesuits (France-India)
 Elisa Martinez (1905–1991), Founder of the Daughters of Saint Mary of Leuca (Italy)
 Othon Motta (1913–1985), Bishop of Campanha (Brazil)

July 2016
 Romano Guardini (1885–1968), Priest of the Archdiocese of Munich-Freising (Italy-Germany)
 Giuseppe Mazzanti (1879–1954), Priest of the Diocese of Imola; Founder of the Little Sisters of Saint Therese of the Child Jesus (Italy)
 Maria von Mörl (1790–1868), Layperson of the Diocese of Bolzano-Bressanone; Member of the Secular Franciscans (Italy)
 Gaetana [Agata Tanina] Nastasi (1914 0 1926), Child of the Diocese of Acireale (Italy)
 Jorge Novak (1928–2001), Professed Priest of the Society of the Divine Word; Bishop of Quilmes (Argentina)
 Antonietta (Maria) Zanelli (1887–1957), Founder of the Little Sisters of Saint Therese of the Child Jesus (Italy)

June 2016
 Bernardino de Antequera (1572-1634), Professed Priest of the Jesuits (Spain)
 Jose Cappel Farfsing [Joseph Henry Cappel] (1908–2004), Priest of the Maryknoll Missionary Society (United States-Chile)
 Margarita Fonseca Silvestre (1884–1945), Founder of the Servants of Christ the Priest (Colombia)
 Patrick Ryan (1845–1878), Priest of the Diocese of Knoxville (Ireland-United States)

May 2016
 Ivan Burik (1928–1991), Priest of the Archdiocese of Đakovo-Osijek; Martyr (Serbia-Croatia)
 Federico [Friedrich] Grote (1853–1940), Professed Priest of the Redemptorists (Germany-Argentina)
 Teresa Kearney (Mary Kevin) (1875–1957), Founder of the Little Sisters of Saint Francis and the Franciscan Missionary Sisters for Africa (Ireland-Uganda-United States)
 Manuel (prob. 1604–1686), Layperson of the Archdiocese of Mercedes-Luján (Angola-Argentina)
 Joseph Müller (1894–1944), Priest of the Diocese of Hildesheim; Martyr (Germany)
 Christophe Munzihirwa Mwene Ngabo (1926–1996), Professed Priest of the Jesuits; Archbishop of Bukavu (Democratic Republic of Congo)
 Helena Perera [Charithaya] (ca. 1848–1931), Layperson of the Diocese of Chilaw (Sri Lanka)
 Jorge Maria [Georges] Salvaire (1847–1899), Priest of the Congregation of the Mission (Vincentians) (France-Argentina)
 Lourdu Xavier Savarirayan (1910–1972), Priest of the Diocese of Kumbakonam (India)
 Ivan [Ivica] Simrak (1912–1944), Priest of the Eparchy of Križevci; Martyr (Croatia)
 Mónika Tímár [Schmidt] (1937–1962), Professed Religious of the Cistercian Nuns (Hungary)

April 2016
 Jeremy Joyner White (1938–1990), Layperson of the Personal Prelature of the Holy Cross and Opus Dei (United Kingdom-Nigeria)
 Czeslawa Wojtczak (Maria Wlodzimira) (1909–1943), Professed Religious of the Sisters of Saint Elizabeth (Poland)

March 2016
 Alonzo de Barzana (ca. 1530–1597), Professed Priest of the Jesuits (Spain-Peru)
 Clement Shahbaz Bhatti (1968–2011), Married Layperson of the Archdiocese of Islamabad-Rawalpindi; Martyr (Pakistan)
 Louis Camilleri (1923–2011), Professed Religious of the Brothers of the Christian Schools (De La Salle Brothers) (Malta)
 María Eugenia González Lafón (María Eugenia of the Holy Trinity) (1876–1962), Founder of the Catechist Sisters of Mary Most Holy, Order of Saint Benedict (Mexico)

February 2016
 Andrea Aziani [Andres Aziani Samek-Lodovici] (1953–2008), Layperson of the Diocese of Carabayllo; Member of the Memores Domini Lay Association (Italy-Peru)
 Magdalena Mortęska (ca. 1554–1631), Professed Religious of the Benedictine Nuns (Poland)
 Teresa Tambelli (1884–1964), Vowed Member of the Daughters of Charity of Saint Vincent de Paul (Italy)

January 2016
 Thayr Saidālla Abdāl and 44 Companions (d. 2010), Priests and Layfaithful of the Archeparchy of Baghdad and Beirut of the Syrians; Martyrs (Iraq)
 Bernard Digal and 6 Lay Companions (d. 2008), Priest and Laypeople of the Archdiocese of Cuttack-Bhubaneswar; Martyrs (India)
 Ante Gabrić (1915–1988), Professed Priest of the Jesuits (Croatia-India)
 Carmela (Pura) Pagani (1914–2001), Professed Religious of the Little Sisters of the Holy Family (Italy)
 Francesco Palliola [Paleola] (1612–1648), Professed Priest of the Jesuits; Martyr (Italy-Philippines)

2015

December 2015
 Sante (Pellegrino) Boni (1898–1990), Professed Priest of the Franciscan Friars Minor (Italy)
 Italo Calabró (1925–1990), Priest of the Archdiocese of Reggio Calabria-Bova (Italy)
 Luigi [Luis] Cecchin (1924–2010), Priest of the Diocese of Treviso; Fidei Donum Missionary in the Diocese of Nazare (Italy)
 Ira Barnes Dutton (Joseph) (1843–1931), Layperson of the Diocese of Honolulu; Member of the Secular Franciscans (United States)
 Matteo Farina (1990–2009), Young Layperson of the Archdiocese of Brindisi-Ostuni (Italy)
 Rafila Gălut (1910-1939), Layperson of the Eparchy of Lugoj (Romania)
 Aloÿs Kobès (1820–1872), Professed Priest of the Congregation of the Holy Spirit (Spiritians); Apostolic Vicar of Senegambia; Founder of the Daughters of the Holy Heart of Mary and the Brothers of Saint Joseph (France-Senegal)
 Edvard Vajnilovič [Edward Woynillowicz] (1847–1928), Married Layperson of the Archdiocese of Minsk-Mohilev (Belarus-Poland)
 George Willmann (1920–1977), Professed Priest of the Jesuits (United States-Philippines)

November 2015
 William Edward Bill Atkinson (1946–2006), Professed Religious of the Augustinians (United States)
 André Bortolameotti (1919–2010), Professed Priest of the Congregation of Jesus the Priest (Italy-Brazil)
 Maria Josefa Brandis (Leopoldina) (1815–1900), Vowed Member of the Daughters of Charity of Saint Vincent de Paul; Founder of the Marian Sisters of the Miraculous Medal (Austria)
 Alberto Ferri Garavelli (1935–2009), Professed Priest of the Comboni Missionaries of the Sacred Heart (Italy)

October 2015
 Henry II the Pious [Henryk II Pobozny] (ca. 1196–1241), Married Layperson of the Diocese of Legnica (Poland)
 Charles Journet (1891–1975), Titular Bishop of Furnos Minor; Cardinal (Switzerland)
 Ange Le Proust (1624–1697), Professed Priest of the Augustinians; Founder of the Sisters of Saint Thomas of Villanueva (France)
 Giovanni Vaccari (1913–1971), Professed Religious of the Servants of Charity (Guanellians) (Italy-Spain)

September 2015
 Floribert Bwana Chui bin Kositi (1981–2007), Layperson of the Archdiocese of Goma; Member of the Saint Egidio Community; Martyr (Democratic Republic of Congo)
 Martyrs of "La Florida" Missions (d. 1549–1706), Professed Priest and Religious' of the Dominicans; Franciscans, Augustinians and Jesuits; Pilgrim and Native Laypeople of and from the Dioceses of Pensacola-Tallahassee and Saint Augustine; Martyrs (Spain, Italy, Mexico, and United States)
 Luis de Cancer (1500–1549), Professed Priest of the Dominicans; Martyr (Spain-United States)
 Isidoro Meschi (1945–1991), Priest of the Archdiocese of Milan (Italy)
 Bernardo de Monroy and 2 Trinitarian Companions (d. 1613–1622), Professed Priest of the Trinitarians; Martyrs (Spain-Algeria)

May 2015
 Mikiel Azzopardi (1910–1987), Priest of the Archdiocese of Malta (Malta)
 Benedicto Teodoro Barbero Bermejo and 18 Companions (d. 1936), Priests from the Diocese of Plasencia; Martyrs (Spain)
 Eugen Bolz (1881-1945), Married Layperson of the Diocese of Rottenberg-Stuttgart; Martyr (Tübingen - Berlin, Germany)
 Joseph Chhmar Salas (1937–1977) and 34 Companions (d. 1971–78), Bishop of Phnom Penh; Priests of the Paris Foreign Mission Society and of the Dioceses from Cambodia along with lay companions from various Apostolic Vicariates (France, Vietnam, Cambodia)

April 2015
 Alberto Fuger (1892–1970), Professed Priest of the Jesuits (France-Brazil)
 Francesca Lancellotti Zotta (1917–2008), Married Layperson of the Vicariate of Rome (Italy)
 Pietro Manghisi (1889–1953), Priest of the Pontifical Institute for Foreign Missions; Martyr (Italy-Myanmar)
 Declan O'Toole (1971–2002), Priest of the Mill Hill Missionaries; Martyr (Ireland-Uganda)
 Santo Perin (1917–1945), Priest of the Archdiocese of Ravenna-Cervia (Italy)

March 2015
 Theresia Albers (1872–1949), Founder of the Sisters Witnesses of the Love of Christ (Germany)
 Giosuè dei Cas (1880–1932), Professed Religious of the Comboni Missionaries of the Heart of Jesus (Italy-South Sudan)
 Giuseppe Diana (1958–1994), Priest of the Diocese of Aversa; Martyr (Italy)
 Francisco Gíron Fernandez (1938–2009), Priest of the Diocese of Huelva (Spain)
 Anton Strle (1915–2003), Priest of the Archdiocese of Ljubljana (Slovenia)
 Adolfine Tönnies (Maria Michaele) (1862–1934), Cofounder of the Sisters Servants of the Holy Spirit of Perpetual Adoration (Germany-Netherlands)

February 2015
 Eduardo Bonnín Aguiló (1917–2009), Layperson of the Diocese of Mallorca; Founder of the Cursillos in the Christianity Movement (Spain)
 Manuel Armindo de Lima and 3 Companions (d. 1982), Priest of the Missionary Society of the Good News; Laypersons of the Diocese of Viana; Postulant of the Mercedarian Sisters of Charity; Catechist (Italy-Angola)
 Francisco González Metola (1905–1967), Priest of the Diocese of Cadiz-Cueta (Spain)
 Pablo Muñoz Vega (1903–1994), Professed Priest of the Jesuits; Archbishop of Quito; Cardinal (Ecuador)

January 2015
 Zilda Arns Neumann (1934-2010), Married Layperson of the Archdiocese of Curitiba (Brazil-Haiti)
 Paolo Angelo Ballerini (1814–1897), Archbishop of Milan (Italy)
 Giuseppe Gabana (1904–1944), Priest of the Diocese of Brescia; Martyr (Italy)
 Jeanne Le Ber (1662–1714), Consecrated Layperson of the Archdiocese of Montreal (Canada)
 Marie-Léonie Martin (Francoise-Therese) (1863–1941), Professed Religious of the Visitation Nuns (France)
 Jesús Pla Gandía (1915–2000), Bishop of Siguenza-Guadalajara (Spain)
 Johann Georg Seidenbusch (1641–1729), Priest of the Oratorians (Germany)

2014

December 2014
 Hernán Alessandri Morandé (1935–2007), Professed Priest of the Secular Institute of the Schoenstatt Fathers (Chile)
 Miguel Cano Gutiérrez (1866–1924), Priest of the Archdiocese of Guadalajara; Founder of the Servants of the Holy Trinity and the Poor (Mexico)
 Joseph Verbis Lafleur (1912–1944), Priest of the Military Ordinate of the United States (United States-Philippines)
 Eduardo Laforet Dorda (1957–1984), Professed Member of the Secular Institute of the CrUnited Statesders of Mary (Spain)
 Stjepan Milanović (Lovro) (1777–1807), Professed Priest of the Franciscan Friars Minor (Bosnia-Herzegovina)
 Lewis Thomas (Paul James) Wattson (1863–1940), Founder and Professed Priest of the Franciscan Friars of the Antonement (United States)

November 2014
 Ignace-Alexandre-Joseph Cardon and 4 Cistercian Companions (d. 1799), Professed Priests, Religious' and Cleric of the Cistercians (Congregation of Casamari); Martyrs (France-Italy)
 Maria Teresa Carloni (1919–1983), Layperson of the Archdiocese of Urbino-Urbania-Sant’Angelo in Vado (Italy)
 Eufemia of Racibórz (ca. 1299–1359), Professed Religious of the Dominican Nuns (Poland)
 Gabriel Gonsum Ganaka (1937–1999), Archbishop of Jos (Nigeria-United States)
 Enrico Smaldone (1914–1967), Priest of the Diocese of Nocera Inferiore-Sarno (Italy)
 Sebastian Lawrence Casimir Presentation Valiyathayil (1867–1936), Priest of the Diocese of Allepey; Founder of the Visitation Sisters of Allepey (India)
 Göbou Yaza (d. 1928?), Young Layperson of the Diocese of N’Zérékoré; Catechumen; Martyr (Guinea)

October 2014
 Fortunata Evolo Nicolace (1938–2009), Married Layperson of the Diocese of Mileto-Nicotera-Tropea (Italy)
 Maria de Lourdes [Lourdinha] Benedicta Nogueira Fontão (1930–1988), Married Layperson of the Diocese of São João da Boa Vista (Brazil)
 Cármen Antunes de Matos Fortuna [Carmita] (1937–1980), Layperson of the Diocese of Setubal (Portugal)
 Teresa Militerni (1874–1925), Professed Religious of the Sisters of Saint John the Baptist (Italy)

September 2014
 Jean-Baptiste Gerin (1797–1863), Priest of the Diocese of Grenoble-Vienne (France)
 Franziska May (Reinolda) (1901–1981), Professed Religious of the Missionary Benedictine Sisters of Tutzing (Germany-South Africa)
 Maria Cesira Pazzafini (Veronica) (1896–1964), Professed Religious of the Capuchin Nuns (Italy)
 Ida Peterfy (1922–2000), Founder of the Society Devoted to the Sacred Heart (Slovakia-United States)
 Adão Salgado Vaz de Faria (1907–1990), Priest of the Archdiocese of Braga; Founder of the Congregation of Divine Providence and the Holy Family (Portugal)

August 2014
 Giuseppe Bracci (Giacinto) (1877–1967), Professed Priest of the Franciscan Friars Minor (Italy)
 Mario Gentili (1928–2006), Professed Religious of the Augustinians (Italy)
 Angelina Lo Dico (1900–1932), Layperson of the Diocese of Caltanisetta (Italy)
 Fermín Emilio Lobo (Antonio of Jesus) (1873–1942), Professed Priest of the Franciscan Friars Minor (Argentina); Cause officially opened since September 19, 1958 and re-opened in this month of August 2014.
 Amador Tajanlangit Sr. (1911–1977), Married Layperson of the Archdiocese of Jaro (Philippines)
 Reginaldo Toro (1830–1904), Professed Priest of the Dominicans; Bishop of Cordoba; Founder of the Dominican Tertiary Sisters of Saint Joseph (Argentina)

July 2014
 Maria Cantamessa Gallo (1913–1995), Married Layperson of the Diocese of Asti (Italy)
 Heinrich König (1900–1942), Priest of the Archdiocese of Paderborn; Martyr (Germany)
 Rosa Maria Segale (Blandina) (1850–1941), Professed Religious of the Sisters of Charity of Cincinnati (Italy-United States)

June 2014
 Cosimo Berlinsani (1619–1694), Professed Priest of the Cleric Regular of the Mother of God; Founder of the Oblate Sisters of the Child Jesus (Italy)
 Vincenzo Idà (1909-1984), Priest of the Diocese of Oppido Mamertina-Palmi; Founder of the Missionary Sisters of Catechism and the Missionaries of Evangelization (Italy-Mexico)
 Anna Moroni (1613–1675), Founder of the Oblate Sisters of the Child Jesus (Italy)

May 2014
 Fritz Michael Gerlich (1861–1934), Married Layperson of the Archdiocese of Munich-Freising; Martyr (Poland-Germany)
 Remigio Salazar Amador (1802–1857), Priest of the Diocese of Leon (Nicaragua)
 Silvio Pasquali (1864–1924), Priest of the Pontifical Institute for Foreign Missions; Founder of the Catechist Sisters of Saint Anne (Italy-India)
 Ouseph Thekkekara (Canisius of Saint Teresa) (1914–1998), Professed Priest of the Carmelites of Mary Immaculate (India)
 Guido Vidal França Schäffer (1974–2009), Seminarian of the Archdiocese of Sao Sebastiao do Rio de Janeiro (Brazil)

April 2014
 Paulette Callabat (1923–2005), Consecrated Member of the Caritas Christi Secular Institute (France)
 Robert Naoussi (ca. 1940–1970), Layperson of the Archdiocese of Douala (Cameroon)
 Auguste [Nonco] Pelafigue (1888–1977), Layperson of the Diocese of Lafayette; Member of the Apostleship of Prayer League (France-United States)
 Antonio Rivera Ramírez (1916–1936), Young Layperson of the Archdiocese of Toledo (Spain); Cause officially opened since January 10, 1962 and re-opened on the month of April 2014.

March 2014
 Rutilio Grande García (1928–1977), Professed Priest of the Jesuits; Martyr (El Salvador)
 Luise Löwenfels (Maria Aloysia) (1915–1942), Professed Religious of the Poor Handmaids of Jesus Christ; Martyr (Germany-Poland)
 Ascensión Sacramento Sánchez y Sánchez (1911–1946), Professed Member of the Secular Institute "Evangelical CrUnited Statesde" (Spain)
 Maria Margaretha van Valkenisse (Maria Margaretha of the Angels) (1605-1758), Professed Religious of the Discalced Carmelite Nuns (Atwerp, Belgium - North Brabant, Netherlands)

February 2014
 Nicoletta Giordano (Maria Petra) (1912–2006), Professed Religious of the Dominican Nuns (Italy)
 Martín Lawers González (1881–1933), Priest of the Diocese of Irapuato; Martyr (Mexico)

January 2014
 Maria Borgato (1898–1945), Professed Member of the Secular Institute of the Company of Saint Ursula, Federation of the Secular Institute of Saint Angela Merici; Martyr (Italy-Germany)
 Joseph Leon Cardijn (1891–1967), Titular Archbishop of Tusuros; Cardinal; Founder of the Young Christian Workers (Jocists) (Belgium)
 Mariano Dubón Alonso (1861–1934), Priest of the Diocese of Leon (Nicaragua)
 Juan Luis Ellacuria Echevarría (Aloysius) (1905–1981), Professed Priest of the Claretians (Spain-United States)
 Julia Greeley (ca. 1833–48 – 1918), Layperson of the Archdiocese of Denver (United States)
 Julius Aemilius de Lombaerde (Júlio Maria) (1878–1944), Professed Priest of the Missionaries of the Holy Family; Founder of the Missionaries of Our Lady of the Most Blessed Sacrament, the Daughters of the Immaculate Heart of Mary and the Sisters of the Our Lady of the Most Blessed Sacrament (Belgium-Brazil)
 Cyprien [Sipiriyani] Rugamba (ca. 1935–1994) and Daphrose [Daforoza] Mukasanga (ca. 1944–1994) and 6 Companions, Married Couple, Young Laypeople and Children from the Archdiocese of Kigali; Members of the Emmanuel Community; Martyrs (Rwanda)

2013

December 2013
 Thatipatri Gnanamma (ca. 1822–1874), Widow; Founder of the Sisters of Saint Anne of Chennai and the Sisters of Saint Anne of Phirangipuram (India)
 Joaquín Carlos Paredes Pérez (Jesús of the Cross) (1911–1998), Professed Religious of the Franciscan Friars Minor (Argentina-Spain)
 Luigi Pera (1879–1952), Professed Priest of the Augustinians (Italy)
 Anna Bohuslava Tomanová (1904–1957), Layperson of the Diocese of Hradec Kralove (Czech Republic)
 Ioannes Baptista Yi Byeok and 132 Companions (d. 1785–1879), Laypeople from the Apostolic Vicariate of South Korea; Martyrs (S. Korea-N. Korea)

November 2013
 Catherine De Bar (Mechtilde of the Blessed Sacrament) (1614–1698), Founder of the Benedictine Sisters of the Blessed Sacrament (France)
 Alexandre Toé (1967–1996), Professed Priest of the Camillians (Burkina Faso-Italy)
 George Vakayil [Vakayilachan] (1883–1931), Priest of the Archdiocese of Verapoly (India)
 Marianno Wachira and 26 Companions (d. 1952–1955), Laypeople from the Archdioceses of Nyeri and Nairobi along with the Dioceses of Murang’a and Meru; Catechumens; Professed Religious' of the Consolata Missionary Sisters and the Sisters of Mary Immaculate of Nyeri; Martyrs (Kenya-Italy)

October 2013
 Marianna Fortunata Cherubini (Maria Giuseppa of the Sacred Heart) (1788–1844), Professed Religious of the Sisters of Perpetual Adoration (Italy); Cause opened in November 1844 and re-opened in October 2013
 Giuseppe Cinquina (1918–1945), Priest of the Diocese of Vasto-Chieti (Italy)
 Michael Jerome Cypher (1941–1975), Professed Priest of the Franciscan Conventuals; Martyr (United States-Honduras)
 Juan Ignacio Larrea Holguín (1927–2006), Priest of the Personal Prelature of the Holy Cross and Opus Dei; Archbishop of Guayaquil (Argentina-Ecuador)
 Felice Piccirilli (1912–1968), Priest of the Diocese of Vasto-Chieti (Italy)
 Adolfo Rodriguez Vidal (1920–2003), Priest of the Personal Prelature of the Holy Cross and Opus Dei; Bishop of Santa Maria de Los Ángeles (Spain-Chile)

September 2013
 Nedjelko (Dominik) Barač (1912–1945), Professed Priest of the Dominicans; Martyr (Croatia)
 Henri [Benoit Thuân] Denis (1880–1933), Professed Priest of the Cistercians (Holy Family Congregation) (France-Vietnam)
 Teresa Grigolini (1853–1931), Professed Religious of the Comboni Missionary Sisters (Italy)

August 2013
 Eugenio Romero Pose (1949–2007), Auxiliary Bishop of Madrid (Spain)

July 2013
 Aloyse Gerber (Joseph-Marie of Eckbolsheim) (1907–1993), Professed Priest of the Franciscan Capuchins (France)

June 2013
 Andrew Bertie (1929-2008), Layperson of the Vicariate of Rome; Prince and Grand Master of the Sovereign Military Order of Malta (United Kingdom-Italy)
 Antonio Campelo de Aragão (1904–1984), Professed Priest of the Salesians of Don Bosco; Bishop of Petrolina; Founder of the Sisters Mediators of Peace (Brazil)
 Peter Porekuu Dery (ca. 1918–2008), Archbishop of Tamale; Cardinal (Ghana)
 Chiara [Silvia] Lubich (1920-2008), Layperson of the Diocese of Frascati; Founder of the Focolare Movement (Italy)
 Carlo Noè (1878–1960), Priest of the Diocese of Treviso (Italy)

May 2013
 Francisco Comabarros Sorribas (Tarcisio de Jesús) (1907–1989), Professed Religious of the Brothers of the Christian Schools (De La Salle Brothers) (Spain)
 Juan Pablo Góngora Alvarado (1894–1976), Priest of the Archdiocese of Yucatán; Founder of the Missionary Daughters of the Holy Mother of Light (Mexico)
 Joaquín Llorente Llorens (1893–1964), Married Layperson of the Diocese of Orihuela-Alizante (Spain)

March 2013
 Mary Glowrey (Mary of the Sacred Heart) (1887-1957), Professed Religious of the Society of Jesus Mary Joseph (Australia-India)
 Ivan (Rafo) Kalinić (1910–1943), Professed Priest of the Franciscan Friars Minor; Martyr (Croatia)
 Franjo Kuharić (1919–2002), Archbishop of Zagreb; Cardinal (Croatia)
 Maria Zofia Szymanowska (1910–1983), Layperson of the Diocese of Kalisz (Ukraine-Poland)

February 2013
 Carlo Acutis (1991-2006), Child of the Archdiocese of Milan (United Kingdom-Italy) (beatified on October 10, 2020)
 Marcelino Olaechea Loizago (1888–1972), Professed Priest of the Salesians of Don Bosco; Archbishop of Valencia (Spain)
 Julia Teresa Tallon (Mary Teresa) (1867-1954), Founder of the Parish Visitors of Mary Immaculate (United States)

January 2013
 Ailbertus of Antoing (ca. 1060–1122), Professed Priest of the Canons Regular of Saint Augustine (Belgium-Germany)
 Benigna Cardoso da Silva (1928-1941), Child of the Diocese of Crato; Martyr (Ceará, Brazil) (to be beatified on 2020)

See also
 List of people declared venerable by Pope Francis
 List of saints canonized by Pope Francis
 List of people beatified by Pope Francis

References

Dicastery for the Causes of Saints
Servants of God
Canonization